Feimaņi Parish is an administrative unit of Rēzekne Municipality, Latvia. The administrative centre is the village of Feimaņi.

References

External links 
 

Parishes of Latvia
Rēzekne Municipality